Clair Cameron Patterson (June 2, 1922 – December 5, 1995) was an American geochemist. Born in Mitchellville, Iowa, Patterson graduated from Grinnell College. He later received his Ph.D. from the University of Chicago and spent his entire professional career at the California Institute of Technology (Caltech).

In collaboration with George Tilton, Patterson developed the uranium–lead dating method into lead–lead dating. By using lead isotopic data from the Canyon Diablo meteorite, he calculated an age for the Earth of 4.55 billion years, which was a figure far more accurate than those that existed at the time, and one that has remained largely unchanged since 1956.

Patterson first encountered lead contamination in the late 1940s as a graduate student at the University of Chicago. His work on this subject led to a total re-evaluation of the growth in industrial lead concentrations in the atmosphere and the human body, and his subsequent campaigning was seminal in the banning of tetraethyllead in gasoline and lead solder in food cans.

Early life 
He was born in Mitchellville, Iowa. His father was a mail carrier and his mother was a member of the school board; Patterson had one brother, Paul, and one sister, Patricia. From a young age he was encouraged by his family to pursue his intellectual curiosity. Patterson graduated from high school in 1939, at the age of 16. He attended Grinnell College—close enough that Patterson would hitchhike home to do laundry—and graduated with a degree in chemistry in 1943. There, he met his future wife, Lorna (Laurie) McCleary. For graduate school, they both attended the University of Iowa, where he was awarded an M.A. in molecular spectroscopy. He also married Lorna McCleary just before leaving the University of Iowa in 1944. Both were then sent to work on the Manhattan Project as civilians, first at the University of Chicago and then at Oak Ridge, Tennessee, where he encountered mass spectrometry.

After World War II, the Pattersons returned to Chicago, where Laurie took a research job as an infrared spectroscopist to support Patterson while he studied for his Ph.D. at the University of Chicago under Harrison Brown. While studying at an old laboratory, Patterson was able to make discoveries involving the lead that he ended up studying later in his life.  He made several different experiments which led to shocking results for the time period involving the lead. After a postdoctoral year at Chicago, Patterson moved with Brown to the Division of Geology (later the Division of Geological and Planetary Sciences) at the California Institute of Technology in 1952, as founding members of its geochemistry program. Patterson remained at Caltech for the rest of his life. He and Laurie had four children.

Measurement of the Earth's age
Patterson returned to the University of Chicago to work under his research adviser Harrison Brown. Brown, knowing about Patterson's experience with mass spectrometry, teamed him up with George Tilton to do geological aging on zircons. Zircons are extremely useful for dating since, when they are formed, they possess tiny imperfections of uranium, but no lead. Therefore, if any lead is present in the zircon, it must come from the decay of uranium. This process is known as U-Pb dating. The job of the team was to measure the concentration and isotopic compositions of the elements inside the zircon. Tilton was to measure the uranium and Patterson, the amount and type of lead. The goal for Patterson was to figure out the composition of the primordial lead in the Earth. In doing so, it would be possible to figure out the age of the solar system and, in turn, the Earth by using the same techniques on meteorites.

As Patterson and Tilton began their work in 1948, Patterson quickly became aware that his lead samples were being contaminated. They knew the age of the igneous rock from which the zircon came, and Tilton's uranium measurements aligned with what should be in a zircon at that particular age, but Patterson's data always was skewed with too much lead. After six years, the team published a paper on methods of determining the ages of zircon crystals and Patterson earned his Ph.D., but they were no closer in determining the age of the Earth.

Brown was able to receive a grant from the United States Atomic Energy Commission to continue work on dating the Earth, but more importantly, to commission a new mass spectrometer in Pasadena, California at Caltech. In 1953, Brown brought Patterson along with him to Caltech, where Patterson was able to build his own lab from scratch. In it, he secured all points of entry for air and other contaminants. Patterson also acid cleaned all apparatuses and even distilled all of his chemicals shipped to him. In essence, he created one of the first clean rooms ever, in order to prevent lead contamination of his data. He then was able to finish his work with the Canyon Diablo meteorite in 1953. He used the mass spectrometer at the Argonne National Laboratory on isolated iron-meteorite lead to collect data on the abundance of lead isotopes. With the new data, in 1956 he published “Age of Meteorites and the Earth”, the first paper containing the true age of the solar system's accretion, which was 4.550Gy ± 70My.

Before the major discovery was made, it was believed by the public that the earth was around 3.3 billion years old. Many were very surprised to find that the actual age of the earth was much more than what they had expected. The publicity that came after the discovery was made was handled quite well by Patterson, who made the statement, "we did it" in several interviews, sharing the honor of the discovery with his fellow scientific minds behind the action.

Tracing geochemical evolution of Earth
Patterson's ability to isolate microgram quantities of lead from ordinary rocks and to determine their isotope composition led him to examining the lead in ocean sediment samples from the Atlantic and the Pacific. Deriving from the different ages at which the landmasses had drained into the ocean, he was able to show that the amount of anthropogenic lead presently dispersed into the environment was more than 100 times the amount naturally leached by streams into the ocean: the geochemical cycle for lead appeared to be badly out of balance.

The limitations of the analytic procedures led to his use of other approaches. He found that deep ocean water contained up to 20 times less lead than surface water, in contrast to similar metals such as barium. That led him to doubt the commonly held view that lead concentrations had grown by only a factor of two over naturally occurring levels.

Patterson returned to the problem of his initial experiment and the contamination he had found in the blanks used for sampling. He determined, through ice-core samples from Camp Century in Greenland taken in 1964 and from Antarctica in 1965, that atmospheric lead levels had begun to increase steadily and dangerously soon after tetraethyl lead began to see widespread use in fuel, when it was discovered to reduce engine knock in internal combustion engines. Patterson subsequently identified that, along with the various other uses of lead in manufacturing, as the cause of the contamination of his samples. Because of the significant public-health implications of his findings, he devoted the rest of his life to removing as much introduced lead from the environment as possible.

Campaign against lead poisoning

Beginning in 1965, with the publication of Contaminated and Natural Lead Environments of Man, Patterson tried to draw public attention to the problem of increased lead levels in the environment and the food chain from lead from industrial sources. Perhaps partly because he was criticizing the experimental methods of other scientists, he encountered strong opposition from those then recognized as experts, such as Robert A. Kehoe.

In his effort to ensure that lead was removed from gasoline (petrol), Patterson fought against the lobbying power of the Ethyl Corporation (which employed Kehoe), against the legacy of Thomas Midgley, Jr. (which included tetraethyllead and chlorofluorocarbons), and against the lead additive industry as a whole. Following Patterson's criticism of the lead industry, he was refused contracts with many research organizations, including the supposedly-neutral United States Public Health Service. In 1971, he was excluded from a National Research Council (NRC) panel on atmospheric lead contamination, even though he was then the foremost expert on the subject.

The United States mandated the use of unleaded gasoline to protect catalytic converters in all new cars starting with the 1975 model year, but Patterson's efforts accelerated the phaseout of lead from all standard, consumer automotive gasoline in the United States by 1986. Lead levels within the blood of Americans are reported to have dropped by up to 80% by the late 1990s.

Most people, following Kehoe's arguments, referred to "normal levels" of lead in blood, soil, and air, meaning values near the average. They assumed that because these levels were common, they were harmless. "Normal" also carries some of the meaning "natural". Patterson argued that "normal" should be replaced by "typical" and that just because a certain level of lead was commonplace, it did not mean it was without harm. "Natural", he insisted, was limited to concentrations of lead that existed in the body or environment before contamination by humans, which has occurred frequently due to technological advancements and cultural traditions.

Due to his ultraclean chamber, considered one of the first clean rooms, his measurements of isotopic ratios were free of the contamination that confounded the findings of Kehoe and others. Where Kehoe measured lead in "unexposed" workers in a TEL plant and Mexican farmers, Patterson studied mummies from before the Iron Age and tuna raised from pelagic waters. Kehoe claimed that humans had adapted to environmental lead. Patterson's precise point was that humans only recently had increased their concentration of lead and that the short span of exposure, a few thousand years, was an instant in the Darwinian time scale, nowhere near the time needed to develop adaptive responses.

Patterson focused his attention on lead in food, for which similar experimental deficiencies also had marked increases. In one study, he showed an increase in lead levels from 0.3 to 1400 ng/g in certain canned fish compared with fresh, while the official laboratory had reported an increase of 400 ng/g to 700 ng/g. He compared the lead, barium, and calcium levels in 1600-year-old Peruvian skeletons and showed a 700- to 1200-fold increase in lead levels in modern human bones, with no comparable changes in the barium and calcium levels.

In 1978, he was appointed to a National Research Council panel that acknowledged many of the increases and the need for reductions, but other members argued the need for more research before recommending action. His opinions were expressed in a 78-page minority report, which argued that control measures should start immediately, including gasoline, food containers, paint, glazes, and water distribution systems.

Death
Patterson died in his home in Sea Ranch, California, at the age of 73 on December 5, 1995. The reported cause of his death was a severe asthma attack.

Awards and honors
J. Lawrence Smith Medal, 1973 (National Academy of Sciences)
V. M. Goldschmidt Award, 1980 (Geochemical Society)
Tyler Prize for Environmental Achievement, 1995 (University of Southern California)
 Minor planet 2511 Patterson is named in his honor.

Memorials
 Clair C. Patterson Award, awarded annually since 1998 by the Geochemical Society

Legacy

Patterson was the subject of a 2022 documentary by Derek Muller, The Man Who Accidentally Killed The Most People In History.

References

Further reading (and listening)

Denworth, L. Toxic Truth: A Scientist, A Doctor, and the Battle over Lead, Beacon Press, 2009.

Rebelsky, Samuel A., SamR's Assorted Musings and Rants: Grinnellians you should know (or know about): Clair Patterson '43, retrieved October 9, 2022

External links

Clair Cameron Patterson (Geochemist) at The Caltech Archives

1922 births
1995 deaths
American geochemists
Grinnell College alumni
Manhattan Project people
People from Polk County, Iowa
People from Sea Ranch, California
American environmentalists
Recipients of the V. M. Goldschmidt Award